Kozhikode, also known in English as Calicut, is a city along the Malabar Coast in the state of Kerala in India. It has a corporation limit population of 609,224 and a metropolitan population of more than 2 million, making it the second largest metropolitan area in Kerala and the 19th largest in India. Kozhikode is classified as a Tier 2 city by the Government of India.

It is the largest city in the region known as the Malabar and was the capital of the British-era Malabar district. In antiquity and the medieval period, Kozhikode was dubbed the City of Spices for its role as the major trading point for Indian spices. It was the capital of an independent kingdom ruled by the Samoothiris (Zamorins). The port at Kozhikode acted as the gateway to medieval South Indian coast for the Chinese, the Persians, the Arabs and finally the Europeans. According to data compiled by economics research firm Indicus Analytics in 2009 on residences, earnings and investments, Kozhikode was ranked the second best city in India to live in.

Etymology
The exact origin of the name Kozhikode is uncertain. According to many sources, the name Kozhikode is derived from Koyil-kota (fort), meaning fortified palace. Koil or Koyil or Kovil  is the Tamil term for a distinct style of Hindu temple with Dravidian architecture. Both the terms kōyil and kōvil are used interchangeably. The name also got corrupted into Kolikod, or its Arab version Qāliqūṭ and later its anglicized version Calicut.
The Arab merchants called it Qāliqūṭ (IPA: qˠaːliqˠːuːtˤ). Chinese merchants called it Kūlifo. Tamils called it as Kallikottai. 

The city is officially named Kozhikode in Malayalam, and in English, it is known by its anglicised version, Calicut.
The word calico, a fine variety of hand-woven cotton cloth that was exported from the port of Kozhikode, is thought to have been derived from Calicut. It is the historical capital of Kerala as the history dates back to 1498 AD when Vasco da Gama landed in Kappad, near Calicut.

History

The ancient port of Tyndis which was located on the northern side of Muziris, as mentioned in the Periplus of the Erythraean Sea, was somewhere around Kozhikode. Its exact location is a matter of dispute. The suggested locations are Ponnani, Tanur, Beypore-Chaliyam-Kadalundi-Vallikkunnu, and Koyilandy. Tyndis was a major center of trade, second only to Muziris, between the Cheras and the Roman Empire. Pliny the Elder (1st century CE) states that the port of Tyndis was located at the northwestern border of Keprobotos (Chera dynasty). The North Malabar region, which lies north of the port at Tyndis, was ruled by the kingdom of Ezhimala during Sangam period. According to the Periplus of the Erythraean Sea, a region known as Limyrike began at Naura and Tyndis. However   Ptolemy mentions only Tyndis as Limyrike'''s starting point. The region probably ended at Kanyakumari; it thus roughly corresponds to the present-day Malabar Coast. The value of Rome's annual trade with the region was estimated at around 50,000,000 sesterces. Pliny the Elder mentioned that Limyrike was  prone by pirates. The Cosmas Indicopleustes mentioned that the Limyrike was a source of peppers.Das, Santosh Kumar (2006). The Economic History of Ancient India. Genesis Publishing Pvt Ltd. p. 301.

In the 14th century, Kozhikode conquered larger parts of central Kerala after the seize of Tirunavaya region from Valluvanad, which were under the control of the king of Perumbadappu Swaroopam (Cochin). The ruler of Perumpadappu was forced to shift his capital (c. CE 1405) further south from Kodungallur to Kochi. In the 15th century, the status of Cochin was reduced to a vassal state of Kozhikode, thus leading to the emergence of Kozhikode as the most powerful kingdom in medieval Malabar Coast.During the 15th century Kalaripayat was important in the history of Malabar, some warriors lived, most notably puthooram veettil Aromal Chekavar and his sister Unniyarcha who were chieftains of martial arts.

The port at Kozhikode held the superior economic and political position in medieval Kerala coast, while Kannur, Kollam, and Kochi, were commercially important secondary ports, where the traders from various parts of the world would gather. Kozhikode was the capital of an independent kingdom ruled by the samoothiris (Zamorins) in the Middle Ages and later of the erstwhile Malabar District under British rule. Arab merchants traded with the region as early as 7th century, and Portuguese explorer Vasco da Gama landed at Kozhikode on 20 May 1498, thus opening a trade route between Europe and India. A Portuguese factory and the fort was intact in Kozhikode for short period (1511–1525, until the Fall of Calicut). The English landed in 1615 (constructing a trading post in 1665), followed by the French (1698) and the Dutch (1752). In 1765, Mysore captured Kozhikode as part of its occupation of the Malabar Coast. Kozhikode, once a famous cotton-weaving centre, gave its name to the Calico cloth.

It was ranked eleventh among Tier-II Indian cities in job creation by a study conducted by ASSOCHAM in 2007.

Early Kozhikode in foreign accounts
Accounts of the city and the conditions prevailing then can be gleaned from the chronicles of travellers who visited the port city.

Ibn Battuta (1342–1347), who visited six times, gives the earliest glimpses of life in the city. He describes Kozhikode as "one of the great ports of the district of Malabar" where "merchants of all parts of the world are found here". The king of this place, he says, "shaves his chin just as the Haidari Fakeers of Rome do... The greater part of the Muslim merchants of this place are so wealthy that one of them can purchase the whole freightage of such vessels put here and fit out others like them".

Ma Huan (1403 AD), the Chinese sailor part of the Imperial Chinese fleet under Cheng Ho (Zheng He) lauds the city as a great emporium of trade frequented by merchants from around the world. He makes note of the 20 or 30 mosques built to cater to the religious needs of the Muslims, the unique system of calculation by the merchants using their fingers and toes (followed to this day) and the matrilineal system of succession.

Abdur Razzak (1442–43) the ambassador of Persian Emperor Sha-Rohk finds the city harbour perfectly secured and notices precious articles from several maritime countries especially from Abyssinia, Zirbad and Zanzibar.

The Italian Niccolò de' Conti (1445), perhaps the first Christian traveller who noticed Kozhikode, describes the city as abounding in pepper, lac, ginger, a larger kind of cinnamon, myrobalans and zedoary.

The Russian traveller Athanasius Nikitin or Afanasy Nikitin (1468–74) calls 'Calecut' a port for the whole Indian sea and describes it as having a "big bazaar."

Other travellers who visited Kozhikode include the Italian Ludovico di Varthema (1503–1508) and Duarte Barbosa.

The Zamorins

Kozhikode and its suburbs formed part of the Polanad kingdom, which was a vassal state to the Kolathunadu of North Malabar,  ruled by the Porlatiri. The Eradis of Nediyiruppu at Kondotty in Eranad (Malappuram district) wanted an outlet to the sea, to initiate trade and commerce with the distant lands. and after fighting with the king Polatthiri for 48 years conquered the area around Panniankara. After this, Menokki became the ruler of Polanad and came to terms with the troops and people. After this, the town of Kozhikode was founded close to the palace at Tali. Then, the Eradis shifted their headquarters from Nediyiruppu to Kozhikode. The Governor of Ernad built a fort at a place called Velapuram to safeguard his new interests. The fort most likely lent its name to Koyil Kotta the precursor to Kozhikode. Thus the city came into existence sometime in the 13th century CE. The status of Udaiyavar increased and he became known as Swami Nambiyathiri Thirumulpad, and eventually Samuri or Samoothiri. Europeans called him in a corrupt form as Zamorin.

At the peak of their reign, the Zamorins ruled over a region from Kollam (Quilon) to Panthalayini Kollam (Koyilandy). Following the discovery of sea route from Europe to Kozhikode in 1498, the Portuguese began to expand their territories and ruled the seas between Ormus and the Malabar Coast and south to Ceylon. Kallingal Madathil Rarichan Moopan and Pullambil Moopan and Vamala Moopan families were very prominent among those who said that two centuries ago, some Jenmis in Kozhikode were engaged in sea trade and shipping.

According to K.V. Krishna Iyer, the rise of Kozhikode is at once a cause and a consequence of Samoothiri's ascendancy in Kerala. By the end of the century, Samoothiri was at the zenith of his powers with all princes and chieftains of Kerala north of Kochi acknowledging his suzerainty. The Sweetmeat Street (Mittayi Theruvu) was an important trading street under Zamorin's rule.

The First Battle of Cannanore that occurred in January 1502 between the Third Portuguese Armada and Kingdom of Cochin under João da Nova and Zamorin of Calicut's navy marks the beginning of Portuguese conflicts in the Indian Ocean. The defeat of joint fleet of the Sultan of Gujarat, the Mamlûk Burji Sultanate of Egypt, and the Zamorin of Calicut with support of the Republic of Venice and the Ottoman Empire in Battle of Diu in February 1509 marks the beginning of Portuguese dominance of the Spice trade and the Indian Ocean. The continuous wars between Zamorin navy under Kunjali Marakkars and Portuguese in the 16th century CE reduced the importance of Kozhikode as a centre of trade. The Kunjali Marakkars are credited with organizing the first naval defense of the Indian coast.

The Zamorin in the beginning of next century expelled Portuguese with the help of Dutch East India Company. and In 1602, the Zamorin sent messages to Aceh promising the Dutch a fort at Kozhikode if they would come and trade there. Two factors, Hans de Wolff and Lafer, were sent on an Asian ship from Aceh, but the two were captured by the chief of Tanur, and handed over to the Portuguese. A Dutch fleet under Admiral Steven van der Hagen arrived at Kozhikode in November 1604. It marked the beginning of the Dutch presence in Kerala and they concluded a treaty with Kozhikode on 11 November 1604, which was also the first treaty that the Dutch East India Company made with an Indian ruler. By this time the kingdom and the port of Kozhikode was much reduced in importance. The treaty provided for a mutual alliance between the two to expel the Portuguese from Malabar. In return the Dutch East India Company was given facilities for trade at Kozhikode and Ponnani, including spacious storehouses.

British Rule
The arrival of British in Kerala can be traced back to the year 1615, when a group under the leadership of Captain William Keeling arrived at Kozhikode, using three ships. It was in these ships that Sir Thomas Roe went to visit Jahangir, the fourth Mughal emperor, as British envoy. Travancore became the most dominant state in Kerala by defeating the Zamorin of Kozhikode in the battle of Purakkad in 1755. Kozhikode came under British Rule after the Mysorean conquest of Malabar in the late 18th century CE.The British later also formed a regiment called the Thiyyar Regiment to meet their military operations in Malabar. Nagendra k.r.singh Global Encyclopedia of the South India Dalit's Ethnography (2006) page.230, Google Books 
 
Kozhikode was the capital city of Malabar District, one of the two districts in the western coast (Malabar Coast) of Madras presidency. During the British rule, Malabar's chief importance lay in producing pepper, coconut, tiles, and teak. Kozhikode municipality was formed on 1 November 1866 according to the Madras Act 10 of 1865 (Amendment of the Improvements in Towns act 1850) of the British Indian Empire, making it the first modern municipality in the state.

Post Independence
Kozhikode Municipality was upgraded into Kozhikode Municipal Corporation in the year 1962, making it the second-oldest Municipal Corporation in the state.

Climate
Kozhikode has a tropical monsoon climate (Köppen climate classification Am). A brief spell of pre-monsoon Mango showers hits the city sometime during April. However, the primary source of rain is the South-west monsoon that sets in the first week of June and continues until September. The city receives significant precipitation from the North-East Monsoon that sets in from the second half of October through November.

Demographics

Total Population under Municipal Corporation limits is 550,440. Males form 47.7% and females 52.3%.

Kozhikode has been a multi-ethnic and multi-religious town since the early medieval period. The Hindus form the largest religious group, followed by Muslims and Christians. Hindus form the majority at 57.37% of the population with 315807 members. Muslims form 37.6% of the population with 207298 members.

The corporation of Kozhikode has an average literacy rate of 96.8% (national average is 74.85%). The male literacy rate is 97.93% and female literacy rate is 95.78%.

Pre-modern Kozhikode was already teeming with people of several communities and regional groups. Most of these communities continued to follow their traditional occupations and customs till the 20th century. Brahmins, too, lived in the city mostly around the Hindu temples. Regional groups like the Tamil Brahmins, Gujaratis and Marwari Jains became part of the city and lived around their shrines.

The Nairs formed the rulers, warriors and landed gentry of Kozhikode.The Thiyyas formed the vaidyars (Ayurveda Physicians), local militia and traders of Kozhikode. The Samoothiri had a ten thousand strong Nair bodyguard called the Kozhikkottu pathinaayiram (The 10,000 of Kozhikode) who defended the capital and supported the administration within the city. He had a larger force of 30,000 Nairs in his capacity as the Prince of Eranadu, called the Kozhikkottu Muppatinaayiram (The 30,000 of Kozhikode). The Nairs also formed the members of the suicide squad (chaver). 
The Muslims of Kozhikode are known as Mappilas, and according to the official Kozhikode website "the great majority of them are Sunnis following the Shafi school of thought. There are some smaller communities among the Muslims such as Dawoodi Bohras of Gujarati origin. Many of the Muslims living in the historic part of the city follow matrilineality and are noted for their piety. Though Christianity is believed to have been introduced in Kerala in the 1st century CE, the size of community in Malabar (northern Kerala) began to rise only after the arrival of the Portuguese missionaries towards the close of the 15th century. A few Christians of Thiruvitankoor and Kochi have lately migrated to the hilly regions of the district and are settled there.

The Tamil Brahmins are primarily settled around the Tali Siva temple. They arrived in Kozhikode as dependants of chieftains, working as cooks, cloth merchants and moneylenders. They have retained their Tamil language and dialects as well as caste rituals. The Gujarati community is settled mostly around the Jain temple in and around the Valliyangadi. They owned many establishments, especially textile and sweet shops. They must have arrived in Kozhikode at least from the beginning of the 14th century. They belong to either the Hindu or the Jain community. A few Marwari families are also found in Kozhikode who was basically moneylenders.

Civic administration
The city is administered by the Kozhikode Corporation, headed by a mayor. For administrative purposes, the city is divided into 75 wards, from which the members of the corporation council are elected for five years. Recently neighbouring suburbs Beypore, Elathur, Cheruvannur and Nallalam were merged within the municipal corporation.

Kozhikode Corporation is the first City Corporation in Kerala after the creation of the state. Established in 1962, Kozhikode Corporation's first mayor was H Manjunatha Rao. Kozhikode corporation has four assembly constituencies – Kozhikode North, Kozhikode South, Beypore and Elathur – all of which are part of Kozhikode.

Kozhikode Municipal Corporation Election 2020

Law and order
The Kozhikode City Police is headed by a commissioner, an Indian Police Service (IPS) officer. The city is divided into six zones each under a circle officer. Apart from regular law and order, the city police comprise the traffic police, bomb squad, dog squad, fingerprint bureau, women's cell, juvenile wing, narcotics cell, riot force, armed reserve camps, district crime records bureau and a women's station. It operates 16 police stations functioning under the Home Ministry of Government of Kerala.

Transport

Road

National highways

National Highway 66 connects Kozhikode to Mumbai via Mangaluru, Udupi and Goa to the north and Kochi and Kanyakumari near Thiruvananthapuram to the south along the west coast of India. This highway connects the city with the other important towns like, Kasaragod, Kanhangad, Kannur, Thalassery, Mahe, Vadakara, Koyilandy
Ramanattukara, Kottakkal, Kuttippuram, Ponnani, Kodungallur, North Paravur, Ernakulam, Edapally and proceeds to Alappuzha, Thiruvananthapuram and terminates at the southern tip of India, Kanyakumari.

National Highway 766 connects Kozhikode to Bangalore through Kollegal in Karnataka via Tirumakudal Narsipur, Mysore, Nanjangud, Gundlupet, Sulthan Bathery, Kalpetta and Thamarassery.

National Highway 966 connects Kozhikode to Palakkad through Malappuram,Perinthalmanna. At Ramanattukara, a suburb of Kozhikode, it joins NH 66. It passes through major towns like Kondotty, Perinthalmanna, and Mannarkkad and Malappuram. This stretch connects the city and Calicut International Airport.

State Highways

SH 29 passes through the city. It connects NH 212, Malabar Christian College, civil station, Kunnamangalam, Thamarassery, Chellot, Chitragiri and Road to Gudallor from Kerala border.

State highway 38 starts from Pavangad near passes through Ulliyeri, Perambra, Kuttiady, Nadapuram, Panoor & Koothuparamba and ends at Chovva in Kannur. The highway is107;km long. It is one of the busiest route in the district. 

SH 54 connects the city to Kalpetta. The highway passes through Pavangad, Kozhikode, Ulliyeri, Perambra, Poozhithodu, Peruvannamuzhi and Padinjarethara.
SH 68 starts from Kappad and ends in Adivaram.

SH 34 starts from Koyilandy and ends in Edavanna which is 44.0 km long. This highway passes through Koyilandi, Ulliyeri, Balussery, Thamarassery, Omassery, Mukkam.

Buses
Buses, predominantly run by individual owners, ply on the routes within the city and to nearby locations. City buses are painted green. Kerala State Road Transport Corporation (KSRTC) runs regular services to many destinations in the state and to the neighboring states. The city has three bus stands. All private buses to the suburban and nearby towns ply from the Palayam Bus Stand. Private buses to adjoining districts start from the Mofussil Bus Stand on Indira Gandhi Road (Mavoor Road). Buses operated by the KSRTC drive from the KSRTC bus stand on Indira Gandhi Road. KSRTC Bus Stand Kozhikode is the largest bus stand in Kerala having a size of 36,036.47 meter square. There are also KSRTC depots in Thamarassery, Thottilpalam, Thiruvambady and Vatakara.
There are three routes available to Bangalore. Kozhikode–Sulthan Bathery-Gundlupet–Mysore–Bangalore is the preferred one and is very busy. Another route, is Kozhikode-Manathavady-Kutta-Mysore-Bangalore. The third one, less used, is Kozhikode–Gundlupet–Chamarajanagar–Kollegal–Bangalore.

Private tour operators maintain regular luxury bus services to Mumbai, Bangalore, Coimbatore, Chennai, Vellore, Ernakulam, Trivandrum, Ooty, Mysore. etc. and mainly operate from the Palayam area. These are usually night services.

Rail
The history of railways in Kerala dates to 1861 when the first tracks were laid between Tirur and Beypore.

Air
It began operations in 1988. Domestic services are operated to major Indian cities. It received the status of an international airport in 2006.

Economy

Calicut is one of the biggest economic hubs in Kerala. Service sector dominates the economy followed by industries. Nedungadi Bank, the first and oldest bank in the modern state of Kerala, was established by Appu Nedungadi at Kozhikode in the year 1899. Cyberpark, a Government of Kerala organisation, plans  to build, operate and manage IT parks for the promotion and development of investment in IT and ITES industries in the Malabar region of Kerala. It would be the third IT hub in the state of Kerala. The two IT parks might create a total 100,000 direct job opportunities. The first project is the development of Cyberpark hub in Kozhikode with its spokes at Kannur and Kazargode IT parks. Other planned projects include the Birla IT park (at Mavoor) and Malaysian satellite city (at Kinaloor) where KINFRA has plans to set up a  industrial park. In 2012, Kozhikode was given the tag of "City of Sculptures" (Shilpa Nagaram) because of the architectural sculptures around the city. Currently there are many IT companies running in UL Cyberpark, Government Cyberpark and Hilite Business Park.

Shopping

The city has a strong mercantile aspect. The main area of business was once Valiyangadi (Big Bazaar) near the railway station. As time progressed, it shifted to other parts of the city. The commercial heart has moved to Mittai Theruvu (Sweetmeat Street or S. M. Street), a long street crammed with shops that sell everything from saris to cosmetics. It also houses restaurants and sweetmeat shops. Today, the city has multiple shopping malls. Focus Mall (First mall of Kerala ), HiLITE Mall, Gokulam Mall, Address Mall and RP Mall are a few among them. LuLu Group International's Lulu Mall is under construction in the areas of Mankavu.

Music
In addition to the Malabar Mahotsavam, the annual cultural fest of Kozhikode, every year since 1981 the Tyagaraja Aradhana Trust has been conducting a five-day music festival in honour of Tyagaraja. The festival is complete with the Uncchavritti, rendering of Divyanama kritis, Pancharatna Kritis, concerts by professional artistes and students of music from morning to late in the evening.

Kozhikode has a tradition of Ghazal and Hindustani music appreciation. There are many Malayalam Ghazals. The late film director and play back singer M. S. Baburaj, from Kozhikode was influenced by Ghazal and Hindustani.

Media
Newspapers
Newspaper publishing started in Kozhikode with the launch of the English weekly West Coast Spectator in 1879. Edited by Dr. Keys and printed by Vakil Poovadan Raman from the Spectator Press, it was rechristened the Malabar Spectator in later years. The first Malayalam newspaper in Kozhikode was Kerala Pathrika established by Chengalathu Kunhirama Menon in 1884. Keralam, Kerala Sanchari and Bharathivasam were among the other newspapers published in Kozhikode in the 19th century. Some of the major newspapers that contributed to the Indian independence movement and the renaissance, such as Al Ameen, Mathrubhumi and Mithavadi, were based in Kozhikode."History of Media in Kerala". Kerala Media Academy. Retrieved 12 February 2023. Now almost all the major newspapers in Malayalam have editions in Kozhikode. English newspapers such as The Hindu and The New Indian Express'' also have Kozhikode editions.

Radio
The Kozhikode radio station of All India Radio has two transmitters: Kozhikode AM (100 kilowatts) and Kozhikode FM [Vividh Bharathi] (10 kilowatts). Private FM radio stations are Radio Mango 91.9 operated by Malayala Manorama Co. Ltd. Radio Mirchi operated by Entertainment Network India Ltd. and Club FM 104.8 operated by Mathrubhumi group and Red FM 93.5 of the SUN Network. AIR FM radio stations are Kozhikode – 103.6 MHz; AIR MW radio station is Kozhikode – 684 kHz.

Television

A television transmitter has been functioning in Kozhikode since 3 July 1984, relaying programmes from Delhi and Thiruvananthapuram Doordarshan. Doordarshan has its broadcasting centre in Kozhikode at Medical College. The Malayalam channels based on Kozhikode are the Shalom Television, Darshana TV and Media One TV. All major channels in Malayalam viz. Manorama News, Asianet, Surya TV, Kairali TV, Amrita TV, Jeevan TV, and Jaihind have their studios and news bureaus in the city.

Satellite television services are available through DD Direct+, Dish TV, Sun Direct DTH and Tata Sky. Asianet Digital TV is popularly known as ACV telecasts daily city news. Spidernet is another local channel. Other local operators include KCL and Citinet.

The Calicut Press Club came into existence in 1970. It is the nerve centre of all media activities, both print and electronic. Begun with around 70 members in the roll, this Press Club, became a prestigious and alert media centre in the state with a present membership of over 280.

Education

There are 1,237 schools in Kozhikode district including 191 highschools.

Kozhikode is home to two premier educational institutions of national importance: the Indian Institute of Management Kozhikode (IIMK), and the National Institute of Technology Calicut (NITC). Other institutions include National Institute for Research and Development in Defence Shipbuilding (NIRDESH), Indian Institute of Spices Research (IISR), and National Institute of Electronics and Information Technology (NIELIT) are also based in Calicut.

This university was established in 1968 and was the second university set up in Kerala. Most of the colleges offering tertiary education in the region are affiliated to this university. The Calicut Medical College was established in 1957 as the second medical college in Kerala. Since then, the institution has grown into a premier centre of medical education in the state. Presently it is the largest medical institute in the state with a yearly intake of 250 candidates for the undergraduate programme.

The Government Law College, Kozhikode situated in Vellimadukunnu on the out skirts of kozhikode town, is owned by the Government of Kerala and affiliated to the University of Calicut. The college caters to the needs of the north Malabar region of Kerala it is the third law college in kerala state founded in 1970.

Main colleges in calicut city:
Zamurians Guruvayoorappan College, Malabar Christian college, Farook College, Devagiri College, Providence college for women, Govt. Arts & science college, Meenchantha, West Hill Government Engineering College, Kozhikode, Kerala Government Polytechnic College, Kozhikode.

In 1876, a school for young Rajas was started in Kozhikode. This was later thrown open to all caste Hindu boys. In 1879, it was affiliated to the University of Madras as a second-grade college and with this, collegiate education in the district received a fillip. Secondary education recorded appreciable progress since 1915. The erstwhile Malabar district, of which the present Kozhikode district formed a part, holds a high rank among the districts of Madras Presidency in secondary education.

Sports

Football
Kozhikode is home to I-League club Gokulam Kerala, they won 2 titles and Durand Cup.

Volleyball
Calicut Heroes Playing in top flight league Prime Volleyball League

Twin/sister cities

Calicut's sister city or twin city is

  Tver, Russia

See also
 North Malabar
 South Malabar
 Kozhikode East
 Kozhikode North
 Kozhikode South
 List of people from Kozhikode

References

Sources

Further reading
  (English translation of the original Arabic version written by Zainudheen Makhdoom in sixteenth century CE)

External links

 Kozhikode District official website

 
Metropolitan cities in India
Cities and towns in Kozhikode district